Greater Than Marriage is a 1924 American silent drama film directed by Victor Halperin and starring Marjorie Daw, Lou Tellegen, and Tyrone Power Sr.

Cast

Preservation
A film collector reportedly has an abridged or incomplete print of Greater Than Marriage.

References

Bibliography
 Goble, Alan. The Complete Index to Literary Sources in Film. Walter de Gruyter, 1999.

External links

1924 films
1924 drama films
1920s English-language films
American silent feature films
Silent American drama films
Films directed by Victor Halperin
American black-and-white films
Vitagraph Studios films
1920s American films